The University of North Carolina at Charlotte (UNC Charlotte or simply Charlotte) is a public research university in Charlotte, North Carolina. UNC Charlotte offers 24 doctoral, 66 master's, and 79 bachelor's degree programs through nine colleges. It is classified among "R2: Doctoral Universities – High research activity".

The university experienced rapid enrollment growth in the late 2000s and early-mid 2010s when it was the fastest-growing institution in the UNC System. In 2020, it surpassed the University of North Carolina at Chapel Hill to become the second-largest school in the UNC system by student enrollment.

It has three campuses: Charlotte Research Institute Campus, Center City Campus, and the main campus, located in University City.

History

The city of Charlotte had sought a public university since 1871 but was never able to sustain one. The city submitted a bid in the late 1880s for what would become North Carolina State University, but lost to the city of Raleigh after a local farmer offered to donate land for the campus. In 1946, the city sought a state-run medical school; instead, the state expanded the existing two-year school at UNC-Chapel Hill.

On September 23, 1946, the State of North Carolina opened the Charlotte Center of the University of North Carolina with an enrollment of 278 students. It was founded to serve the educational needs of returning World War II veterans. Like many of the United States' "post–World War II" universities, it owes its inception to the G.I. Bill and its effects on public education. In 1949, when the state began closing the centers, the Charlotte Center was taken over by the city school district and became Charlotte College, a two-year junior college. It was first funded by student tuition payments, then by local property taxes. Classes were held at Central High School near uptown Charlotte, but by 1957, enrollment increased to 492, and the school's leaders began searching for a permanent site for the campus. They decided on a  tract of land northeast of the city near the Cabarrus County border. The college became state-supported in 1958 upon joining the newly formed North Carolina Community College System and moved to its current location in 1961.

In 1963, Charlotte College became a four-year college. On July 1, 1965, it merged with the Consolidated University of North Carolina (since 1972 called the University of North Carolina) under its current name. In 1969, the university began offering programs leading to master's degrees. In 1992, it was authorized to offer programs leading to doctoral degrees.

Leaders of the university

Bonnie Ethel Cone, founder

Bonnie Ethel Cone (1907–2003), or Miss Bonnie as she was known to students, was chosen to as director of the Charlotte Center in 1946. From 1949 to 1965, she served as president of Charlotte College. When Charlotte College joined the UNC system in 1965, Cone served as acting chancellor until 1966.

Chancellors
Dean W. Colvard (1913–2007) was appointed the first chancellor of the young university in 1966. A North Carolina native, Colvard had served as president of Mississippi State University (MSU). At MSU he was the first president to defy university policy of not playing against integrated teams when he ordered the men's basketball team to play Loyola University Chicago in 1963. At UNC Charlotte, Colvard took on the challenge of converting the school from a small college to a four-year member of the UNC system. Indeed, he had been chosen specifically because UNC system officials believed the newly minted UNC Charlotte needed a leader with experience running a four-year university. Colvard oversaw accreditation of the university, development of University Research Park (now one of the top five largest research parks in the country), constructed the first residence halls, created the first graduate programs, and grew the enrollment from about 1,700 to just over 8,000 students. He retired as chancellor in 1978, served as Chancellor Emeritus until his death. Colvard also received the Order of the Long Leaf Pine. The Colvard building, completed on the main campus in 1979, is named in his honor and houses the Department of Psychology.

E.K. Fretwell (1923–2012), the second chancellor of the university, was named in 1979. He came to the university from Buffalo State College where he was president. Under Fretwell, campus enrollment surged from 8,000 students to over 12,000. He oversaw the creation of the Graduate School, created more graduate degrees, integrated the library's card catalog into the Internet in 1983, created the groundwork for a major business incubator, helped to develop the university's surrounding neighborhood, and increased academic grants to over $6.1 million. Fretwell retired as chancellor in 1989. He served as interim president of the University of Massachusetts system from 1991 to 1992, and in 1998, he served as the interim president of the University of North Florida. In 1996 UNC Charlotte opened the Fretwell building, dedicated in honor of him and his wife Dorrie. The building headquarters the College of Liberal Arts & Sciences.

James H. Woodward succeeded Fretwell in 1989. Woodward came to UNC Charlotte from the University of Alabama at Birmingham where he served as dean of engineering and senior vice president of academic affairs. Under Woodward, enrollment grew to over 19,000 students. Like his predecessors, he continued the growth of the Graduate School and added new doctoral programs. He oversaw the largest fundraising campaign in the school's history and its largest building boom; in the summer of 2005, no less than six buildings were actively under construction on the main campus. He also oversaw the creation of the CRI Campus. Woodward announced his retirement in 2004 and left the office of chancellor on June 30, 2005. Woodward Hall, which houses the College of Computing & Informatics, was dedicated in his honor on November 16, 2005. He is currently Chancellor Emeritus and teaches in the university's William States Lee College of Engineering.

Philip L. Dubois was the fifth leader and fourth chancellor of the university. Dr. Dubois assumed his duties as chancellor on July 15, 2005. He returned to Charlotte after serving as the president of the University of Wyoming from 1997 through 2005. Previously, he was the Provost and Professor of Political Science in the Department of Political Science (now the Department of Political Science and Public Administration) at UNC Charlotte from 1991 until 1997. Dubois, along with his wife and children, was the first chancellor to occupy the Chancellor's Residence (known as the Bissell House) on the UNC Charlotte campus that was completed in the winter of 2005. His goal was to oversee the process of the university becoming the fourth research-extensive university in the state.

2019 shooting 

On April 30, 2019, a mass shooting occurred in the Woodford A. Kennedy Building on campus, killing two and leaving four others injured. The shooter, identified as Trystan Andrew Terrell, was arrested shortly afterwards.

Campuses

Main Campus – University City
The university operates several campuses in Charlotte. The Main Campus is situated on just under 1,000 acres (4 km2) of rolling land between U.S. Route 29 and N.C. Highway 49, about 10 miles (16 km) from Uptown Charlotte in the University City neighborhood. The campus is self-contained, meaning that no major roads run through the campus. The campus boasts several man-made lakes, and is heavily wooded. Near the center of campus are two gardens that attract over 300,000 visitors a year. The architecture of the original central campus, particularly the oldest buildings, are precast concrete and utilitarian-looking because they were built with limited state funds in the 1960s and 1970s. Starting in 2014, these buildings are being renovated to today's standards. Under the campus' third chancellor, James Woodward, the campus underwent major changes which continue today. The newest buildings, funded from state bonds, are being constructed in brick with neoclassical architecture. Concrete and asphalt sidewalks have largely been replaced by brick. The campus' road system is being upgraded to include landscaped medians and more trees.

Charlotte Research Institute Campus
The Charlotte Research Institute was created in 2000. It sits on a  campus, attached to the main Charlotte campus, on a tract of land originally named the Millennial Campus. The research-oriented CRI Campus focuses on precision metrology and intelligent manufacturing, optoelectronics and optical communication, and software and information technology. This campus brings together faculty, students, and outside researchers to work together.

The CRI Campus also houses the new, on-campus football stadium, with 15,300 initial seats that can be expanded to more than 40,000.

Center City Campus

The third campus is in the first ward of Uptown Charlotte. This campus focuses on business and evening courses, thus catering to center city workers. Formerly located in the Mint Museum of Craft+Design, the Uptown campus moved into the $50.4 million Center City building at 320 East Ninth Street, at the beginning of the Fall 2011 semester. It is next to the ninth Street Station of the LYNX Blue Line Extension and First Ward Park, and houses the nationally ranked Master of Business Administration (MBA), Master of Urban Design (MUD), Master of Public Administration (MPA), and other graduate programs. The facility contains an art gallery, a 300-seat auditorium, and a 110-seat lecture hall. The 12-story, 143,000 square foot Center City building was designed by world-renowned architectural firm KieranTimberlake. The building features exterior glass walls individually tailored to the amount of sunlight, and cantilevered multi-story blocks which provide shade and give the building a distinctive look resembling a stack of books.

Students

Approximately 30,000 students were enrolled in the university in the fall of 2020. Students hail from 97 of North Carolina's 100 counties, 45 states, and 103 countries.

Academics

UNC Charlotte is classified among "R2: Doctoral Universities – High research activity." In 2014, UNC Charlotte was ranked the 38th top college in the United States by the Social Mobility Index college rankings. The 2013 edition of the U.S. News & World Report Best Colleges ranked the university's undergraduate program 199th overall among national universities, however by 2020 it had dropped to 227 The 2023 U.S. News rankings have it as 219th out of 443 "National Universities". Forbes placed the university at 252 from among  498 nationwide.

Colleges and programs
The university offers 171 majors that lead to 79 baccalaureate (bachelor's degree) degrees, 66 master's degree programs, and 24 doctoral programs. Fifteen degree and certificate programs are offered via distance education, from 25% to 100% online.

The university is divided into nine colleges:
 College of Liberal Arts & Sciences - academic disciplines including the humanities, social sciences, natural sciences, and mathematics
 College of Arts + Architecture - fine and performing arts (art, theater, dance, and music), as well as the School of Architecture, which is housed within the college
 Cato College of Education - the school of education
 College of Health and Human Services - social work Kinesiology, and athletic training; also contains the School of Nursing and programs like public health and health administration.
 William States Lee College of Engineering - engineering college with undergraduate and graduate programs in the following: civil and environmental engineering, mechanical engineering and engineering science, electrical and computer engineering, systems engineering and engineering management, construction management, and engineering technology
 College of Computing and Informatics - computer science, computer programming, health informatics, and bioinformatics; as of April 2021, the College of Computing and Informatics is the largest computing college in North Carolina — and the number 1 producer of computer science graduates in North Carolina, South Carolina, and Virginia.
 Belk College of Business - the business school, which offers undergraduate, graduate and executive education in five major departments: Accounting, Business Information Systems & Operations Management (BISOM), Economics, Finance, Management, and Marketing. The college offers three undergraduate degrees (Bachelor of Science in Accounting, Bachelor of Science in Business Administration, and Bachelor of Science in economics); five master's programs (Master of Business Administration, Master of Accountancy, Master of Science in Economics, Master of Science in Real Estate, and Master of Science in Mathematical Finance as well as a Professional Science Master's (PSM) program in Data Science and Business Analytics); a Doctorate in Business Administration and a Ph.D. in Business Administration concentrating in finance. The college was established in 1965, became the College of Business Administration in 1971, and was renamed the Belk College of Business in honor of the Belk family in 1990.
 University College - general education college for undergraduates who have not yet declared a major
 Honors College - a selective honors college that seeks to provide students with a liberal arts college experience
 Graduate School - graduate school; works with the undergraduate colleges to organize the master's and doctoral degree programs

Scholarships
In 2009, UNC Charlotte received the largest single donation from a private source, when The Leon Levine Family Foundation donated $9.3 million to the university to form the Levine Scholars program. The scholarship program, named for Leon and Sandra Levine, provides a four-year scholarship to UNC Charlotte. The scholarship includes tuition, fees, books, room, four summer experiences, and an $8,000 grant for community service initiatives.

In addition to the Levine Scholars, the university offers eleven other merit-based scholarship programs.

Library system
UNC Charlotte's J. Murrey Atkins Library, named for the first chairman of the Board of Trustees of Charlotte College, has over 3.3 million volumes, including 930,000 e-books, over 400 databases, and approximately 75,000 journals, the vast majority available electronically, as well as an area for special collections. The recently renovated library includes a ten-story tower that accentuates the library's place at the heart of UNC Charlotte's campus. In April 2007, Atkins received its one-millionth volume, a copy of T. S. Eliot's The Waste Land. A special collections section is housed on the tenth floor at the top of the library.

Athletics

The nickname of the athletic teams are the 49ers, indicative of the fact that UNC Charlotte (then Charlotte College) was saved from permanent closure in 1949. The mascot is "Norm the Niner," a gold miner. The school's colors are green and white; gold and black are both featured in the logo and frequently used in the uniforms of several sports.

For athletics purposes, the school is known as simply Charlotte, a change made official by the athletic department on August 23, 2000. The athletic department sponsors sixteen varsity teams and competes in the NCAA's Division I. The university is a full member of Conference USA, but will be moving to the American Athletic Conference following the 2022-23 calendar season. On September 18, 2008, Chancellor Dubois recommended adding a Division I FCS football program to UNC Charlotte. On November 13, 2008, the UNC Charlotte Board of Trustees voted 8–0 in favor of adding football to the university.

Men's basketball

Men's basketball, coached by Ron Sanchez. The team has reached the NCAA Tournament 11 times, including a trip to the Final Four in 1977. NBA players that once suited up for the 49ers include Boston Celtics great Cedric Maxwell, DeMarco Johnson, 2001 NBA Draft lottery pick Rodney White, and Eddie Basden.

Women's basketball
Women's basketball has seen a surge in popularity on campus over the past several years, with the 2003 team, led by coach Katie Meier, reaching the NCAA Tournament for the first time. Meier was succeeded in 2005 by Amanda Butler, who left after two seasons to take over the same position at the University of Florida. Karen Aston took the reins for the 2007–08 season; Cara Consuegra served as head coach for the 2011 season. In the 2021-22 season, Consuegra led the team to a CUSA regular season and tournament championship, resulting in an NCAA tournament berth.

Baseball
Charlotte Baseball has made 6 NCAA Tournament appearances with the most recent coming in 2021. The 49ers have four conference tournament championships, and eight regular season conference championships. Baseball alums with Major League experience include Bryan Harvey (Angels), Jeff Johnson (Yankees),  Chris Haney (Kansas City Royals), John Maine (New York Mets), Jason Stanford (Cleveland Indians). Fieldin Culbreth is a recently retired MLB umpire who worked the 2008 World Series.

Football

Charlotte's Division I FCS football team kicked off in 2013. It plays at Jerry Richardson Stadium, which holds approximately 15,000 people and can be expanded to hold up to 40,000 people. Its first game was a 52–7 victory against Campbell University on August 31, 2013.

The football program moved up to Division I FBS in 2015 and play as members of Conference USA. The Charlotte 49ers participated in their first bowl game in 2019 against the Buffalo Bulls in the Bahamas Bowl.

Charlotte has had 4 players selected in the NFL Draft; Larry Ogunjobi, Nate Davis, Alex Highsmith, and Cameron Clark.

Men's Golf
In September 2007, the Charlotte men's golf team reached the ranking of being the top-rated golf team in the nation.

Men's soccer
The men's soccer team reached the College Cup in 1996 and 2011. The team advanced all the way to the 2011 NCAA Division I Men's Soccer Championship, losing to UNC-Chapel Hill and finishing second in the national polls. Former 49ers soccer players now playing in the MLS include Floyd Franks, Donnie Smith, Brandt Bronico, and Jon Busch. The team won a conference title in 2013–2014.

Track and field
The men's and women's track and field teams have also made national berth, throughout the school's history. Their most notable athlete is Shareese Woods. She is the most decorated athlete in school history, running professionally for ADIDAS.

Volleyball
Women's volleyball is one of the largest sponsors of the Side-Out Foundation's "Dig Pink" for breast cancer awareness.

Student organizations

There are a large number of student organizations associated with the university. Their focuses include academic, graduate, honor societies, interest, international, multicultural, political, religious, service, secret societies, and sports. UNC Charlotte also boasts a diverse Greek life, with over 10 sororities and 14 fraternities serving the campus community.

Notable alumni and faculty

Every graduate of UNC Charlotte automatically becomes a member of the Alumni Association, an organization of more than 147,000 former students whose primary purpose is to advance the interests of the university. There are no membership fees or annual dues, but there is an expectation that members will be active participants in the organization. In addition to promoting the interests of UNC Charlotte, the Alumni Association acts as a network of UNC Charlotte graduates who assist each other in their personal, professional and social development, and recognize and cheer the accomplishments of their fellow members. The association offers members a number of benefits and services. Some are in the form of information and communications, including a UNC Charlotte magazine and a quarterly electronic newsletter which keeps alumni up to date on news from the association and the university. The only requirement for membership is that alumni maintain contact with the Office of Alumni Affairs, provide an up-to-date address for alumni files, and keep the association informed about their personal progress and career achievements.

See also 
 Dale F. Halton Arena
 Lee Rose
 Jeff Mullins
 Bobby Lutz

Notes

References

External links
 
 
 Charlotte Athletics website

 
Educational institutions established in 1946
Universities and colleges in Charlotte, North Carolina
University of North Carolina at Charlotte
Universities and colleges accredited by the Southern Association of Colleges and Schools
1946 establishments in North Carolina